This is a list of the mammal species recorded in South Africa. There are 299 mammal species in South Africa, of which two are critically endangered, eleven are endangered, fifteen are vulnerable, and thirteen are near threatened. Two of the species listed for South Africa are considered to be extinct.

The following tags are used to highlight each species' conservation status as assessed by the International Union for Conservation of Nature:

Some species were assessed using an earlier set of criteria. Species assessed using this system have the following instead of near threatened and least concern categories:

Order: Afrosoricida (tenrecs and golden moles) 
The order Afrosoricida contains the golden moles of southern Africa and the tenrecs of Madagascar and Africa, two families of small mammals that were traditionally part of the order Insectivora.

Family: Chrysochloridae
Subfamily: Chrysochlorinae
Genus: Chlorotalpa
 Duthie's golden mole, Chlorotalpa duthieae VU
 Sclater's golden mole, Chlorotalpa sclateri LC
Genus: Chrysochloris
 Cape golden mole, Chrysochloris asiatica LC
 Visagie's golden mole, Chrysochloris visagiei DD
Genus: Chrysospalax
 Giant golden mole, Chrysospalax trevelyani EN
 Rough-haired golden mole, Chrysospalax villosus VU
Genus: Cryptochloris
 De Winton's golden mole, Cryptochloris wintoni CR
 Van Zyl's golden mole, Cryptochloris zyli EN
Genus: Eremitalpa
 Grant's golden mole, Eremitalpa granti NT
Subfamily: Amblysominae
Genus: Amblysomus
 Fynbos golden mole, Amblysomus corriae NT
 Hottentot golden mole, Amblysomus hottentotus LC
 Marley's golden mole, Amblysomus marleyi EN
 Robust golden mole, Amblysomus robustus VU
 Highveld golden mole, Amblysomus septentrionalis NT
Genus: Calcochloris
 Yellow golden mole, Calcochloris obtusirostris LC
Genus: Neamblysomus
 Gunning's golden mole, Neamblysomus gunningi EN
 Juliana's golden mole, Neamblysomus julianae EN

Order: Macroscelidea (elephant-shrews) 
Often called sengis, the elephant shrews or jumping shrews are native to southern Africa. Their common English name derives from their elongated flexible snout and their resemblance to the true shrews.

Family: Macroscelididae (elephant-shrews)
Genus: Elephantulus
Short-snouted sengi, Elephantulus brachyrhynchus LC
Cape sengi, Elephantulus edwardii LC
Bushveld sengi, Elephantulus intufi LC
Eastern rock sengi, Elephantulus myurus LC
Western rock sengi, Elephantulus rupestris LC
Genus: Macroscelides
 Short-eared elephant shrew, Macroscelides proboscideus LC
Genus: Petrodromus
Four-toed sengi, Petrodromus tetradactylus LC

Order: Tubulidentata (aardvarks) 

The order Tubulidentata consists of a single species, the aardvark. Tubulidentata are characterised by their teeth which lack a pulp cavity and form thin tubes which are continuously worn down and replaced.

Family: Orycteropodidae
Genus: Orycteropus
 Aardvark, O. afer

Order: Hyracoidea (hyraxes) 
The hyraxes are any of four species of fairly small, thickset, herbivorous mammals in the order Hyracoidea. About the size of a domestic cat they are well-furred, with rounded bodies and a stumpy tail. They are native to Africa and the Middle East.

Family: Procaviidae (hyraxes)
Genus: Dendrohyrax
 Southern tree hyrax, Dendrohyrax arboreus LC
Genus: Heterohyrax
 Yellow-spotted rock hyrax, Heterohyrax brucei LC
Genus: Procavia
 Cape hyrax, Procavia capensis LC

Order: Proboscidea (elephants) 

The elephants comprise three living species and are the largest living land animals.
Family: Elephantidae (elephants)
Genus: Loxodonta
African bush elephant, L. africana

Order: Primates 

The order Primates contains humans and their closest relatives: lemurs, lorisoids, tarsiers, monkeys, and apes.

Suborder: Strepsirrhini
Infraorder: Lemuriformes
Superfamily: Lorisoidea
Family: Galagidae
Genus: Galago
 Mohol galago, Galago moholi LR/lc
Genus: Otolemur
 Brown greater galago, Otolemur crassicaudatus LR/lc
Suborder: Haplorhini
Infraorder: Simiiformes
Parvorder: Catarrhini
Superfamily: Cercopithecoidea
Family: Cercopithecidae (Old World monkeys)
Genus: Cercopithecus
 Sykes' monkey, Cercopithecus albogularis LR/lc
Genus: Chlorocebus
 Vervet monkey, Chlorocebus pygerythrus LR/lc
Genus: Papio
 Chacma baboon, Papio ursinus LR/lc

Order: Rodentia (rodents) 

Rodents make up the largest order of mammals, with over 40% of mammalian species. They have two incisors in the upper and lower jaw which grow continually and must be kept short by gnawing.

Suborder: Hystricognathi
Family: Bathyergidae
Genus: Bathyergus
 Namaqua dune mole-rat, Bathyergus janetta LC
 Cape dune mole-rat, Bathyergus suillus LC
Genus: Cryptomys
 Damaraland mole-rat, Cryptomys damarensis LC
 Common mole-rat, Cryptomys hottentotus LC
Genus: Georychus
 Cape mole-rat, Georychus capensis LC
Family: Hystricidae (Old World porcupines)
Genus: Hystrix
 Cape porcupine, Hystrix africaeaustralis LC
Family: Petromuridae
Genus: Petromus
 Dassie rat, Petromus typicus LC
Family: Thryonomyidae (cane rats)
Genus: Thryonomys
 Greater cane rat, Thryonomys swinderianus LC
Suborder: Sciurognathi
Family: Pedetidae (spring hares)
Genus: Pedetes
 Springhare, Pedetes capensis LC
Family: Sciuridae (squirrels)
Subfamily: Xerinae
Tribe: Xerini
Genus: Xerus
 South African ground squirrel, Xerus inauris LC
 Mountain ground squirrel, Xerus princeps LC
Tribe: Protoxerini
Genus: Paraxerus
 Smith's bush squirrel, Paraxerus cepapi LC
 Red bush squirrel, Paraxerus palliatus LC
Family: Gliridae (dormice)
Subfamily: Graphiurinae
Genus: Graphiurus
 Small-eared dormouse, Graphiurus microtis LC
 Woodland dormouse, Graphiurus murinus LC
 Spectacled dormouse, Graphiurus ocularis LC
 Rock dormouse, Graphiurus platyops LC
 Stone dormouse, Graphiurus rupicola LC
Family: Nesomyidae
Subfamily: Petromyscinae
Genus: Petromyscus
 Barbour's rock mouse, Petromyscus barbouri LC
 Pygmy rock mouse, Petromyscus collinus LC
 Brukkaros pygmy rock mouse, Petromyscus monticularis LC
Subfamily: Dendromurinae
Genus: Dendromus
 Gray climbing mouse, Dendromus melanotis LC
 Brants's climbing mouse, Dendromus mesomelas LC
 Chestnut climbing mouse, Dendromus mystacalis LC
 Nyika climbing mouse, Dendromus nyikae LC
Genus: Malacothrix
 Gerbil mouse, Malacothrix typica LC
Genus: Steatomys
 Kreb's fat mouse, Steatomys krebsii LC
 Fat mouse, Steatomys pratensis LC
Subfamily: Mystromyinae
Genus: Mystromys
 White-tailed rat, Mystromys albicaudatus EN
Subfamily: Cricetomyinae
Genus: Cricetomys
 Gambian pouched rat, Cricetomys gambianus LC
Genus: Saccostomus
 South African pouched mouse, Saccostomus campestris LC
Family: Muridae (mice, rats, voles, gerbils, hamsters, etc.)
Subfamily: Deomyinae
Genus: Acomys
 Spiny mouse, Acomys spinosissimus LC
 Cape spiny mouse, Acomys subspinosus LC
Subfamily: Otomyinae
Genus: Otomys
 Angoni vlei rat, Otomys angoniensis LC
 Vlei rat, Otomys irroratus LC
 Laminate vlei rat, Otomys laminatus LC
 Saunder's vlei rat, Otomys saundersiae LC
 Sloggett's vlei rat, Otomys sloggetti LC
 Bush vlei rat, Otomys unisulcatus LC
Genus: Parotomys
 Brants's whistling rat, Parotomys brantsii LC
 Littledale's whistling rat, Parotomys littledalei LC
Subfamily: Gerbillinae
Genus: Desmodillus
 Cape short-eared gerbil, Desmodillus auricularis LC
Genus: Gerbillurus
 Hairy-footed gerbil, Gerbillurus paeba LC
 Bushy-tailed hairy-footed gerbil, Gerbillurus vallinus LC
Genus: Tatera
 Cape gerbil, Tatera afra LC
 Highveld gerbil, Tatera brantsii LC
 Bushveld gerbil, Tatera leucogaster LC
Subfamily: Murinae
Genus: Aethomys
 Red rock rat, Aethomys chrysophilus LC
 Grant's rock rat, Aethomys granti LC
 Tete veld aethomys, Aethomys ineptus LC
 Namaqua rock rat, Aethomys namaquensis LC
Genus: Dasymys
 African marsh rat, Dasymys incomtus LC
Genus: Grammomys
 Mozambique thicket rat, Grammomys cometes LC
 Woodland thicket rat, Grammomys dolichurus LC
Genus: Lemniscomys
 Single-striped grass mouse, Lemniscomys rosalia LC
Genus: Mastomys
 Southern multimammate mouse, Mastomys coucha LC
 Natal multimammate mouse, Mastomys natalensis LC
Genus: Mus
 Desert pygmy mouse, Mus indutus LC
 African pygmy mouse, Mus minutoides LC
 Neave's mouse, Mus neavei DD
 Orange mouse, Mus orangiae LC
Genus: Myomyscus
 Verreaux's mouse, Myomyscus verreauxii LC
Genus: Rhabdomys
 Four-striped grass mouse, Rhabdomys pumilio LC
Genus: Thallomys
 Black-tailed tree rat, Thallomys nigricauda LC
 Acacia rat, Thallomys paedulcus LC
 Shortridge's rat, Thallomys shortridgei DD
Genus: Zelotomys
 Woosnam's broad-headed mouse, Zelotomys woosnami LC

Order: Lagomorpha (lagomorphs) 
The lagomorphs comprise two families, Leporidae (hares and rabbits), and Ochotonidae (pikas). Though they can resemble rodents, and were classified as a superfamily in that order until the early 20th century, they have since been considered a separate order. They differ from rodents in a number of physical characteristics, such as having four incisors in the upper jaw rather than two.

Family: Leporidae (rabbits, hares)
Genus: Bunolagus
 Riverine rabbit, Bunolagus monticularis CR
Genus: Pronolagus
 Natal red rock hare, Pronolagus crassicaudatus LR/lc
 Jameson's red rock hare, Pronolagus randensis LR/lc
 Smith's red rock hare, Pronolagus rupestris LR/lc
 Hewitt's red rock hare, Pronolagus saundersiae LR/lc
Genus: Lepus
 Cape hare, Lepus capensis LR/lc
 African savanna hare, Lepus microtis LR/lc
 Scrub hare, Lepus saxatilis LR/lc

Order: Erinaceomorpha (hedgehogs and gymnures) 
The order Erinaceomorpha contains a single family, Erinaceidae, which comprise the hedgehogs and gymnures. The hedgehogs are easily recognised by their spines while gymnures look more like large rats.

Family: Erinaceidae (hedgehogs)
Subfamily: Erinaceinae
Genus: Atelerix
 Southern African hedgehog, Atelerix frontalis LR/lc

Order: Soricomorpha (shrews, moles, and solenodons) 
The "shrew-forms" are insectivorous mammals. Shrews and solenodons closely resemble mice, while moles are stout-bodied burrowers.

Family: Soricidae (shrews)
Subfamily: Crocidurinae
Genus: Crocidura
 Reddish-gray musk shrew, Crocidura cyanea LC
 Greater red musk shrew, Crocidura flavescens LC
 Tiny musk shrew, Crocidura fuscomurina LC
 Lesser red musk shrew, Crocidura hirta LC
 Maquassie musk shrew, Crocidura maquassiensis LC
 Swamp musk shrew, Crocidura mariquensis LC
 Lesser gray-brown musk shrew, Crocidura silacea LC
Genus: Suncus
 Least dwarf shrew, Suncus infinitesimus LC
 Greater dwarf shrew, Suncus lixus LC
 Lesser dwarf shrew, Suncus varilla LC
Subfamily: Myosoricinae
Genus: Myosorex
 Dark-footed forest shrew, Myosorex cafer LC
 Long-tailed forest shrew, Myosorex longicaudatus VU
 Sclater's tiny mouse shrew, Myosorex sclateri VU
 Thin mouse shrew, Myosorex tenuis DD
 Forest shrew, Myosorex varius LC

Order: Chiroptera (bats) 
The bats' most distinguishing feature is that their forelimbs are developed as wings, making them the only mammals capable of flight. Bat species account for about 20% of all mammals.
Family: Pteropodidae (flying foxes, Old World fruit bats)
Subfamily: Pteropodinae
Genus: Eidolon
 Straw-coloured fruit bat, Eidolon helvum LC
Genus: Epomophorus
 Peters's epauletted fruit bat, Epomophorus crypturus LC
 Wahlberg's epauletted fruit bat, Epomophorus wahlbergi LC
Genus: Rousettus
 Egyptian fruit bat, Rousettus aegyptiacus LC
Family: Vespertilionidae
Subfamily: Kerivoulinae
Genus: Kerivoula
 Damara woolly bat, Kerivoula argentata LC
 Lesser woolly bat, Kerivoula lanosa LC
Genus: Phoniscus
 Dubious trumpet-eared bat, Phoniscus aerosa DD
Subfamily: Myotinae
Genus: Cistugo
 Lesueur's hairy bat, Cistugo lesueuri VU
 Angolan hairy bat, Cistugo seabrai NT
Genus: Myotis
 Rufous mouse-eared bat, Myotis bocagii LC
 Cape hairy bat, Myotis tricolor LC
 Welwitsch's bat, Myotis welwitschii LC
Subfamily: Vespertilioninae
Genus: Eptesicus
 Long-tailed house bat, Eptesicus hottentotus LC
 Somali serotine, Eptesicus somalicus DD
Genus: Glauconycteris
 Butterfly bat, Glauconycteris variegata LC
Genus: Hypsugo
 Anchieta's pipistrelle, Hypsugo anchietae LC
Genus: Laephotis
 Botswanan long-eared bat, Laephotis botswanae LC
 De Winton's long-eared bat, Laephotis wintoni LC
Genus: Neoromicia
 Cape serotine, Neoromicia capensis LC
 Melck's house bat, Neoromicia melckorum DD
 Banana pipistrelle, Neoromicia nanus LC
 Rendall's serotine, Neoromicia rendalli LC
 Zulu serotine, Neoromicia zuluensis LC
Genus: Nycticeinops
 Schlieffen's bat, Nycticeinops schlieffeni LC
Genus: Pipistrellus
 Rüppell's pipistrelle, Pipistrellus rueppelli LC
 Rusty pipistrelle, Pipistrellus rusticus LC
Genus: Scotoecus
 Light-winged lesser house bat, Scotoecus albofuscus DD
Genus: Scotophilus
 African yellow bat, Scotophilus dinganii LC
 Greenish yellow bat, Scotophilus viridis LC
Subfamily: Miniopterinae
Genus: Miniopterus
 Lesser long-fingered bat, Miniopterus fraterculus LC
 Natal long-fingered bat, Miniopterus natalensis NT
Family: Molossidae
Genus: Chaerephon
 Ansorge's free-tailed bat, Chaerephon ansorgei LC
 Little free-tailed bat, Chaerephon pumila LC
Genus: Mops
 Angolan free-tailed bat, Mops condylurus LC
 Midas free-tailed bat, Mops midas LC
Genus: Mormopterus
 Natal free-tailed bat, Mormopterus acetabulosus VU
Genus: Otomops
 Large-eared free-tailed bat, Otomops martiensseni NT
Genus: Sauromys
 Roberts's flat-headed bat, Sauromys petrophilus LC
Genus: Tadarida
 Egyptian free-tailed bat, Tadarida aegyptiaca LC
 Madagascan large free-tailed bat, Tadarida fulminans LC
 African giant free-tailed bat, Tadarida ventralis NT
Family: Emballonuridae
Genus: Taphozous
 Mauritian tomb bat, Taphozous mauritianus LC
Family: Nycteridae
Genus: Nycteris
 Egyptian slit-faced bat, Nycteris thebaica LC
 Wood's slit-faced bat, Nycteris woodi NT
Family: Rhinolophidae
Subfamily: Rhinolophinae
Genus: Rhinolophus
Blasius's horseshoe bat, R. blasii 
 Cape horseshoe bat, Rhinolophus capensis NT
 Geoffroy's horseshoe bat, Rhinolophus clivosus LC
 Darling's horseshoe bat, Rhinolophus darlingi LC
 Dent's horseshoe bat, Rhinolophus denti DD
 Rüppell's horseshoe bat, Rhinolophus fumigatus LC
 Hildebrandt's horseshoe bat, Rhinolophus hildebrandti LC
 Lander's horseshoe bat, Rhinolophus landeri LC
 Bushveld horseshoe bat, Rhinolophus simulator LC
 Swinny's horseshoe bat, Rhinolophus swinnyi NT
Subfamily: Hipposiderinae
Genus: Cloeotis
 Percival's trident bat, Cloeotis percivali VU
Genus: Hipposideros
 Sundevall's roundleaf bat, Hipposideros caffer LC

Order: Pholidota (pangolins) 
The order Pholidota comprises the eight species of pangolin. Pangolins are anteaters and have the powerful claws, elongated snout and long tongue seen in the other unrelated anteater species.

Family: Manidae
Genus: Manis
 Ground pangolin, Manis temminckii LR/nt

Order: Cetacea (whales) 

The order Cetacea includes whales, dolphins and porpoises. They are the mammals most fully adapted to aquatic life with a spindle-shaped nearly hairless body, protected by a thick layer of blubber, and forelimbs and tail modified to provide propulsion underwater.

Suborder: Mysticeti
Family: Balaenidae
Genus: Eubalaena
 Southern right whale, Eubalaena australis LR/cd
Family: Balaenopteridae
Subfamily: Balaenopterinae
Genus: Balaenoptera
 Common minke whale, Balaenoptera acutorostrata LR/nt
 Antarctic minke whale, Balaenoptera bonaerensis DD
 Sei whale, Balaenoptera borealis EN
 Bryde's whale, Balaenoptera edeni DD
 Blue whale, Balaenoptera musculus EN
 Fin whale, Balaenoptera physalus EN
Subfamily: Megapterinae
Genus: Megaptera
 Humpback whale, Megaptera novaeangliae LR
Family: Neobalaenidae
Genus: Caperea
 Pygmy right whale, Caperea marginata LR/lc
Suborder: Odontoceti
Superfamily: Platanistoidea
Family: Physeteridae
Genus: Physeter
 Sperm whale, Physeter macrocephalus VU
Family: Kogiidae
Genus: Kogia
 Pygmy sperm whale, Kogia breviceps LR/lc
 Dwarf sperm whale, Kogia sima LR/lc
Family: Ziphidae
Genus: Ziphius
 Cuvier's beaked whale, Ziphius cavirostris DD
Genus: Berardius
 Giant beaked whale, Berardius arnuxii LR/cd
Genus: Tasmacetus
 Shepherd's beaked whale, Tasmacetus shepherdi DD
Subfamily: Hyperoodontinae
Genus: Indopacetus
 Longman's beaked whale, Indopacetus pacificus DD
Genus: Hyperoodon
 Southern bottlenose whale, Hyperoodon planifrons LR/cd
Genus: Mesoplodon
 Blainville's beaked whale, Mesoplodon densirostris DD
 Gray's beaked whale, Mesoplodon grayi DD
 Hector's beaked whale, Mesoplodon hectori DD
 Layard's beaked whale, Mesoplodon layardii DD
 True's beaked whale, Mesoplodon mirus DD
Family: Delphinidae (marine dolphins)
Genus: Cephalorhynchus
 Heaviside's dolphin, Cephalorhynchus heavisidii DD
Genus: Steno
 Rough-toothed dolphin, Steno bredanensis DD
Genus: Sousa
 Indian humpback dolphin, Sousa plumbea DD
Genus: Tursiops
 Indo-Pacific bottlenose dolphin, Tursiops aduncus DD
 Common bottlenose dolphin, Tursiops truncatus DD
Genus: Stenella
 Pantropical spotted dolphin, Stenella attenuata LR/cd
 Striped dolphin, Stenella coeruleoalba LR/cd
 Spinner dolphin, Stenella longirostris LR/cd
Genus: Delphinus
 Long-beaked common dolphin, Delphinus capensis LR/lc
Genus: Lagenodelphis
 Fraser's dolphin, Lagenodelphis hosei DD
Genus: Sagmatias
 Hourglass dolphin, Sagmatias cruciger LR/lc
 Dusky dolphin, Sagmatias obscurus DD
Genus: Lissodelphis
 Southern right whale dolphin, Lissodelphis peronii DD
Genus: Grampus
 Risso's dolphin, Grampus griseus DD
Genus: Peponocephala
 Melon-headed whale, Peponocephala electra LR/lc
Genus: Feresa
 Pygmy killer whale, Feresa attenuata DD
Genus: Pseudorca
 False killer whale, Pseudorca crassidens LR/lc
Genus: Orcinus
 Orca, Orcinus orca LR/cd
Genus: Globicephala
 Short-finned pilot whale, Globicephala macrorhynchus LR/cd
 Long-finned pilot whale, Globicephala melas LR/lc

Order: Carnivora (carnivorans) 

There are over 260 species of carnivorans, the majority of which feed primarily on meat. They have a characteristic skull shape and dentition.
Suborder: Feliformia
Family: Felidae
Subfamily: Pantherinae
Genus: Panthera
Lion, P. leo 
P. l. melanochaita
Leopard, P. pardus 
African leopard, P. p. pardus
Subfamily: Felinae
Genus: Acinonyx
Cheetah, A. jubatus 
Southeast African cheetah, A. j. jubatus
Genus: Caracal
Caracal, Caracal caracal LC
Genus: Leptailurus
Serval, Leptailurus serval LC
Genus: Felis
Black-footed cat, Felis nigripes VU
African wildcat, F. lybica 
Family: Viverridae
Subfamily: Viverrinae
Genus: Civettictis
 African civet, Civettictis civetta LC
Genus: Genetta
 Common genet, Genetta genetta LC
 Rusty-spotted genet, Genetta maculata LC
 Cape genet, Genetta tigrina LC
Family: Herpestidae (mongooses)
Genus: Atilax
 Marsh mongoose, Atilax paludinosus LC
Genus: Cynictis
 Yellow mongoose, Cynictis penicillata LC
Genus: Helogale
 Common dwarf mongoose, Helogale parvula LC
Genus: Herpestes
 Egyptian mongoose, Herpestes ichneumon LC
Cape grey mongoose, Herpestes pulverulentus LC
 Common slender mongoose, Herpestes sanguineus LC
Genus: Ichneumia
 White-tailed mongoose, Ichneumia albicauda LC
Genus: Mungos
 Banded mongoose, Mungos mungo LC
Genus: Paracynictis
 Selous' mongoose, Paracynictis selousi LC
Genus: Rhynchogale
 Meller's mongoose, Rhynchogale melleri LC
Genus: Suricata
 Meerkat, Suricata suricatta LC
Family: Hyaenidae (hyaenas)
Genus: Crocuta
 Spotted hyena, Crocuta crocuta LC
Genus: Parahyaena
 Brown hyena, P. brunnea NT
Genus: Proteles
 Aardwolf, Proteles cristatus LC
Suborder: Caniformia
Family: Canidae (dogs, foxes)
Genus: Vulpes
 Cape fox, Vulpes chama LC
Genus: Lupulella
 Side-striped jackal, L. adusta  
 Black-backed jackal, L. mesomelas  
Genus: Otocyon
 Bat-eared fox, Otocyon megalotis LC
Genus: Lycaon
 African wild dog, L. pictus EN
Family: Mustelidae (mustelids)
Genus: Ictonyx
 Striped polecat, I. striatus LC
Genus: Poecilogale
 African striped weasel, P. albinucha LC
Genus: Mellivora
Honey badger, M. capensis 
Genus: Hydrictis
 Speckle-throated otter, H. maculicollis LC
Genus: Aonyx
 African clawless otter, A. capensis LC
Family: Otariidae (eared seals, sealions)
Genus: Arctocephalus
 Cape fur seal, A. pusillus LC
Antarctic fur seal, A. gazella LC
 Subantarctic fur seal, A. tropicalis LC
Family: Phocidae (earless seals)
Genus: Hydrurga
 Leopard seal, Hydrurga leptonyx LC
Genus: Leptonychotes
 Weddell seal, L. weddellii LC
Genus: Lobodon
 Crabeater seal, L. carcinophagus LC
Genus: Mirounga
 Southern elephant seal, M. leonina LC

Order: Perissodactyla (odd-toed ungulates) 

The odd-toed ungulates are browsing and grazing mammals. They are usually large to very large, and have relatively simple stomachs and a large middle toe.

Family: Equidae (horses etc.)
Genus: Equus
Plains zebra, E. quagga 
Burchell's zebra, E. q. burchellii 
Chapman's zebra, E. q. chapmani 
Quagga, E. q. quagga 
Mountain zebra, E. zebra 
Cape mountain zebra, E. z. zebra 
Family: Rhinocerotidae
Genus: Ceratotherium
White rhinoceros, C. simum.
Southern white rhinoceros, C. s. simum 
Genus: Diceros
Black rhinoceros, D. bicornis 
Southern black rhinoceros, D. b. bicornis 
South-central black rhinoceros, D. b. minor 
South-western black rhinoceros, D. b. occidentalis

Order: Artiodactyla (even-toed ungulates) 

The even-toed ungulates are ungulates whose weight is borne about equally by the third and fourth toes, rather than mostly or entirely by the third as in perissodactyls. There are about 220 artiodactyl species, including many that are of great economic importance to humans.

Family: Cervidae (deer)
Subfamily: Cervinae
Genus: Dama
 European fallow deer, D. dama LC introduced
Family: Suidae (pigs)
Subfamily: Phacochoerinae
Genus: Phacochoerus
 Desert warthog, P. aethiopicus LC extirpated
Cape warthog, P. a. aethiopicus 
 Common warthog, P. africanus LC
Subfamily: Suinae
Genus: Potamochoerus
 Bushpig, Potamochoerus larvatus LR/lc
Family: Hippopotamidae (hippopotamuses)
Genus: Hippopotamus
 Hippopotamus, Hippopotamus amphibius VU
Family: Giraffidae (giraffe, okapi)
Genus: Giraffa
 Giraffe, Giraffa camelopardalis
 South African giraffe (G. c. giraffa) 
Family: Bovidae (cattle, antelope, sheep, goats)
Subfamily: Alcelaphinae
Genus: Alcelaphus
 Red hartebeest, Alcelaphus buselaphus caama LR/cd
 Lichtenstein's hartebeest, Alcelaphus buselaphus lichtensteinii LR/cd
Genus: Connochaetes
 Black wildebeest, Connochaetes gnou LC
 Blue wildebeest, Connochaetes taurinus LR/cd
Genus: Damaliscus
 Bontebok, Damaliscus pygargus LR/cd
 Common tsessebe, Damalicus lunatus lunatus LR/cd
Subfamily: Antilopinae
Genus: Antidorcas
 Springbok antelope, Antidorcas marsupialis LR/cd
Genus: Neotragus
 Suni, Neotragus moschatus LR/cd
Genus: Oreotragus
 Klipspringer, Oreotragus oreotragus LR/cd
Genus: Ourebia
 Oribi, Ourebia ourebi LR/cd
Genus: Raphicerus
 Steenbok, Raphicerus campestris LR/lc
 Cape grysbok, Raphicerus melanotis LR/cd
 Sharpe's grysbok, Raphicerus sharpei LR/cd
Subfamily: Bovinae
Genus: Syncerus
 African buffalo, Syncerus caffer LR/cd
Genus: Tragelaphus
 Nyala, Tragelaphus angasii LR/cd
 Common eland, Tragelaphus oryx LR/cd
 Bushbuck, Tragelaphus scriptus LR/lc
 Greater kudu, Tragelaphus strepsiceros LR/cd
Subfamily: Cephalophinae
Genus: Cephalophus
 Blue duiker, Cephalophus monticola LR/lc
 Red forest duiker, Cephalophus natalensis LR/cd
Genus: Sylvicapra
 Common duiker, Sylvicapra grimmia LR/lc
Subfamily: Hippotraginae
Genus: Hippotragus
 Roan antelope, Hippotragus equinus LR/cd
 Bluebuck, Hippotragus leucophaeus 
 Sable antelope, Hippotragus niger LR/cd
Genus: Oryx
 Gemsbok, Oryx gazella LR/cd
Subfamily: Peleinae
Genus: Pelea
 Grey rhebok, Pelea capreolus LC
Subfamily: Aepycerotinae
Genus: Aepyceros
 Impala, Aepyceros melampus LR/cd
Subfamily: Reduncinae
Genus: Kobus
 Waterbuck, Kobus ellipsiprymnus LR/cd
Genus: Redunca
 Southern reedbuck, Redunca arundinum LR/cd
 Mountain reedbuck, Redunca fulvorufula LC

See also

Notes

External links

 
South Africa
South Africa
Mammals